The 1911 Bucknell football team was an American football team that represented Bucknell University as an independent during the 1911 college football season. In its second season under head coach Byron W. Dickson, the team compiled a 6–3–1 record.

Schedule

References

Bucknell
Bucknell Bison football seasons
Bucknell football